Gilles Aubonney (born 5 September 1958) is a retired Swiss football defender.

References

1958 births
Living people
Swiss men's footballers
FC Fribourg players
FC Bulle players
Association football defenders
Swiss Super League players